Maria Tucci (born June 19, 1941) is an American actress.

She was nominated for the Tony Award for Best Featured Actress in a Play in 1967 for her performance in The Rose Tattoo. She played Koula in the 2015 mini-series The Slap. She also won an OBIE award for her performance as Phaedo in "Talk" by Carl Hancock Rux at the Joseph Papp Public Theater.

Personal life
Tucci was born in New York City, the daughter of Laura Tucci (née Rusconi; 1911-1989) and Niccolò Tucci (1908-1999), a writer. She has a brother, Vieri. Her parents came to America in 1938 to escape from World War II. She is married to editor Robert Gottlieb. Her daughter, Lizzie Gottlieb, is a documentary filmmaker. Her film Today's Man featured her family and tells the story of Tucci's son, Niccolo "Nicky", and his fight with Asperger syndrome. Tucci began her acting education at a young age, studying with Lee Strasberg and Joseph Papp. She briefly attended Barnard College.

Film and television
Tucci began appearing in film in 1969. Her first credits were in Robert Frank's Me and My Brother and a CBS Playhouse production titled Shadow Game. She played Lisa in Sidney Lumet's 1983 film Daniel. In Gus Van Sant's 1995 film To Die For she portrayed Angela Maretto.

Theatre
Tucci made her Broadway debut in 1963, in The Milk Train Doesn't Stop Here Anymore. She has fourteen Broadway credits. Principal roles include Rose Delle Rose opposite Maureen Stapleton in the 1966 production of The Rose Tattoo by Tennessee Williams. In 1967 she starred as Alexandra Giddens in a revival of The Little Foxes by Lillian Hellman, with Anne Bancroft as her mother. In 1969 she was a replacement for Jane Alexander in The Great White Hope. In 1988, she starred in a revival of The Night of the Iguana as Hannah Jelkes. In 2009, she appeared in the production of Mary Stuart as Hanna.

Off-Broadway
Tucci began her career Off-Broadway. One of her earliest credits is a 1963 production of The Trojan Women. In 1986, she starred in a production of A Man for All Seasons as Alice More. Tucci played the role of Ruth Steiner in Collected Stories, in its 1997 New York debut. The play was nominated for the Pulitzer Prize for Drama. In 2014, she appeared in a production of Love and Information at the Minetta Lane Theatre. Regionally she has performed in many shows with the Long Wharf Theatre and the Williamstown Theatre Festival.

References

External links
 
 
 

1941 births
Living people
20th-century American actresses
21st-century American actresses
American film actresses
American stage actresses
American television actresses
American people of Italian descent